Tumbleweed is a 1953 American Western film directed by Nathan Juran and starring Audie Murphy, Lori Nelson, and Chill Wills. It was also known by the alternative title of Three Were Renegades; the title of the 1937 novel Three Were Thoroughbreds by Kenneth Taylor Perkins the film was based on (which had been previously filmed as the 1948 film Relentless).

Plot
Jim Harvey (Audie Murphy) is a guide and guard on a wagon train. After he saves the life of a Yaqui Indian warrior named Tigre, the wagon train is attacked and Harvey realizes their only chance of survival is if he can negotiate a truce with Tigre's father, the chief Aguila (Ralph Moody). Aguila orders Harvey to be knocked out, and tortured later, but he is set free by Tigre's mother. He goes to town and discovers the people on the wagon train were massacred, except for two sisters who Harvey insisted hide in the caves. Harvey is falsely accused of cowardice and the townsfolk threaten to lynch him. Harvey escapes on a borrowed Cayuse horse named Tumbleweed, and tries to prove his innocence, discovering that a white man was responsible for the attack. The horse's intelligence, sure-footedness, and instinct save Harvey, and Murphy's interaction with the horse drives much of the storyline.

Cast
 Audie Murphy as Jim Harvey
 Lori Nelson as Laura
 Chill Wills as Sheriff Murchoree
 Roy Roberts as Nick Buckley
 Russell Johnson as Lam Blandon
 K. T. Stevens as Louella Buckley
 Madge Meredith as Sarah Blandon
 Lee Van Cleef as Marv
 I. Stanford Jolley as Ted
 Ralph Moody as Aguila
 Ross Elliott as Seth Blandon
 Eugene Iglesias as Tigre
 Phil Chambers as Trapper Ross
 Lyle Talbot as Weber
 King Donovan as Wrangler
 Harry Harvey as Prospector

See also
 List of American films of 1953

References

External links
 
 
 

1953 films
1953 Western (genre) films
Audie Murphy
Films directed by Nathan Juran
Films produced by Ross Hunter
American Western (genre) films
Films based on Western (genre) novels
Films about horses
Universal Pictures films
1950s English-language films
1950s American films